Nebykov is a rural locality (a khutor) in Chilekovskoye Rural Settlement, Kotelnikovsky District, Volgograd Oblast, Russia. The population was 133 as of 2010. There are 2 streets.

Geography 
Nebykov is located 47 km northeast of Kotelnikovo (the district's administrative centre) by road. Chilekovo is the nearest rural locality.

References 

Rural localities in Kotelnikovsky District